Elachista bifurcatella is a moth in the family Elachistidae. It was described by Sinev and Sruoga in 1995. It is found in the Russian Far East.

References

Moths described in 1995
bifurcatella
Moths of Asia